Ninoy Aquino Day is a national non-working holiday in the Philippines observed annually on August 21 commemorating the assassination of Senator Benigno "Ninoy" Aquino Jr. He was the husband of Corazon Aquino, who later became Philippine President; His assassination led to the downfall of the dictator and kleptocrat president of the Philippines Ferdinand Marcos on February 25, 1986, through the People Power Revolution. In 2004, the commemoration ceremony for the holiday was held and events were attended by presidents Gloria Macapagal Arroyo and Fidel V. Ramos.

Unlike other dates reserved for national heroes of the Philippines (like Bonifacio Day, Rizal Day, Araw ng Kagitingan, and National Heroes Day), the date is not a "regular holiday" (double pay for working nationals) but only a "special non-working holiday" (premium of thirty-percent for working nationals).

Background
Aquino was a well-known opposition figure and critic of the then-President Ferdinand Marcos. Due to his beliefs, he was later imprisoned for about eight years after martial law was declared in the country. Even in his imprisonment, he sought a parliamentary seat for Metro Manila in the Interim Batasang Pambansa, under the banner of the Lakas ng Bayan (LABAN). He eventually led in the opinion polls and was initially leading the electoral count but eventually lost to the Kilusang Bagong Lipunan (KBL) slate led by First Lady Imelda Marcos. Aquino remained in prison but continued to fight for democracy in the country and against the oppression of the Filipino people. After suffering from a heart attack in March 1980, he and his family moved to the United States for medical treatment, eventually leading to his self-imposed exile for about three years. There, he continued his advocacy by giving speeches to the Filipino-American communities.
Later, he planned to return to the islands to challenge Marcos for the parliamentary elections in 1984. Though some did not feel this was a good idea, he still did so in 1983. Upon returning to the Philippines at Manila International Airport (now renamed Ninoy Aquino International Airport in his honor), he was shot and killed on August 21, 1983, as he was escorted off an airplane by security personnel. This led to several protests at his funeral that sparked snap presidential elections in 1986, which led to the 1986 EDSA Revolution, catapulting his wife, Corazon Aquino, to the presidency.

History
The holiday was created by Republic Act 9256, which was signed into law by President Gloria Macapagal Arroyo on February 25, 2004, twenty-one years after his death and eighteen years after the People Power Revolution, and was sponsored by Senate President Franklin Drilon and House Speaker Jose de Venecia. It requires an EDSA People Power Commission (EPPC) to hold activities in observance the day and shall be funded from the Budget of the Office of the President and from private donations.

A commemoration ceremony was held at the People Power Monument which was attended by Presidents Arroyo and Aquino with her family, and government officials such as members of the cabinet, top police, and military brass.

The holiday was included in President Arroyo's program of "holiday economics", adjusting the observance of the holiday to the nearest Monday in order to boost the tourism industry with long weekends. In 2010, it was moved back to its original date by Aquino's only son, President Benigno Aquino III.

See also 

 Public holidays in the Philippines

References

External links
 REPUBLIC ACT NO. 9256

August observances
Public holidays in the Philippines